Oxneria is a genus of foliose lichens in the family Teloschistaceae. It has four species. The genus was circumscribed in 2003 by Sergey Kondratyuk and Ingvar Kärnefelt, with Oxneria alfredii assigned as the type species.

The generic name honours Ukrainian lichenologist Alfred Mycolayovych Oxner.

Species
, Species Fungorum (in the Catalogue of Life) accepts four species of Oxneria:
Oxneria alfredii 
Oxneria fallax 
Oxneria soechtingii 
Oxneria ussuriensis

References

Teloschistales
Lecanoromycetes genera
Lichen genera
Taxa described in 2003
Taxa named by Ingvar Kärnefelt
Taxa named by Sergey Kondratyuk